Platynota is a genus of moths belonging to the subfamily Tortricinae of the family Tortricidae.

Species
Platynota blanchardi Powell & Brown, 2012
Platynota breviplicana Walsingham, 1897
Platynota calidana (Zeller, 1877)
Platynota capella Walsingham, 1913
Platynota colobota Meyrick, 1926
Platynota egana (Walker, 1866)
Platynota exasperatana (Zeller, 1875)
Platynota flavedana Clemens, 1860
Platynota helianthes (Meyrick, 1932)
Platynota idaeusalis (Walker, 1859)
Platynota illuminata (Meyrick, 1917)
Platynota islameconae Powell & Brown, 2012
Platynota labiosana (Zeller, 1875)
Platynota larreana (Comstock, 1939)
Platynota meridionalis Brown, 2013
Platynota nigrocervina Walsingham, 1895
Platynota obliqua Walsingham, 1913
Platynota offuscata Walsingham, 1913
Platynota polingi Powell & Brown, 2012
Platynota redingtonensis Powell & Brown, 2012
Platynota restitutana (Walker, 1863)
Platynota rostrana (Walker, 1863)
Platynota semiustana Walsingham, 1884
Platynota stultana Walsingham, 1884
Platynota subacida (Meyrick, 1917)
Platynota subargentea Walsingham, 1913
Platynota subtinae Brown, 2013
Platynota texana Powell & Brown, 2012
Platynota viridana Barnes & Busck, 1920
Platynota wenzelana (Haimbach, 1915)
Platynota xylophaea (Meyrick, 1912)
Platynota yumana (Kearfott, 1907)
Platynota zapatana Powell & Brown, 2012
Platynota zymogramma (Meyrick, 1926)

See also
List of Tortricidae genera

References

 , 2005: World catalogue of insects. Volume 5: Tortricidae (Lepidoptera): 1–741.
 , 2013: Two New Neotropical Species of Platynota with Comments on Platynota stultana Walsingham and Platynota xylophaea (Meyrick) (Lepidoptera: Tortricidae). Proceedings of the Entomological Society of Washington 115 (2): 128–139. Abstract: .

External links
tortricidae.com

Platynota (moth)
Sparganothini
Tortricidae genera